Bulbophyllum hirsutiusculum is a species of orchid in the genus Bulbophyllum. It is critically endangered and may be extinct as a result of illegal collection for ornamental use and subsistence woodgathering.

References

The Bulbophyllum-Checklist
The Internet Orchid Species Photo Encyclopedia

hirsutiusculum
Species endangered by the pet trade
Taxa named by Joseph Marie Henry Alfred Perrier de la Bâthie